Open Borders: the Science and Ethics of Immigration is a nonfiction graphic novel by Bryan Caplan and Zach Weinersmith. It was published in 2019 by First Second.

Summary 
The book presents economic and ethical arguments for open borders between countries in a graphic novel format. It suggests that the economic benefits of open borders outweighs the potential downsides. It also rebuts common arguments against immigration such as the economic impact on low-skill native workers and the cultural changes it causes.

Critical reception 
Publishers Weekly praised Caplan's expertise and Weinersmith's art and storytelling skill, saying that the combination made for a compelling argument. While National Review said that the book was "fun to read" and well-presented, they also pointed out that Caplan did not address some obvious counterarguments against open borders and oversimplified the issue. The book was also reviewed by Booklist and The Economist.

References 

2019 graphic novels
Books about immigration
First Second Books books